Sergejs Ivanovs (born 2 May 1971) is a retired Latvian football midfielder.

References

1971 births
Living people
Latvian footballers
FK Daugava (2003) players
FK Ventspils players
FK Liepājas Metalurgs players
Association football midfielders
Latvia international footballers